The following is a list of chancellors of Vanderbilt University

References

Vanderbilt University administrators
Vanderbilt University